Adilabad is a city in the Indian state of Telangana.

Adilabad may also refer to:

Places
 Adilabad district
 Adilabad Rural mandal
 Adilabad (Lok Sabha constituency)
 Adilabad (Assembly constituency)
 Adilabad, Raebareli, a village in Uttar Pradesh, India

See also
Adilabad Fort
Adilabad railway station